Trichonius is a genus of beetles in the family Cerambycidae, containing the following species:

 Trichonius affinis Monne & Mermudes, 2008
 Trichonius atlanticus Monne & Mermudes, 2008
 Trichonius bellus Monne & Mermudes, 2008
 Trichonius fasciatus Bates, 1864
 Trichonius griseus Monne & Mermudes, 2008
 Trichonius minimus Monne & Mermudes, 2008
 Trichonius picticollis Bates, 1864
 Trichonius quadrivittatus Bates, 1864

References

Acanthocinini